Acute oak decline is a disease that infects oak trees in the UK. It mainly affects mature oak trees of over 50 years old of both Britain's native oak species: the pedunculate oak (Quercus robur) and the sessile oak (Quercus petraea). The disease is characterised by the trees bleeding or oozing a dark fluid from small lesions or splits in their bark. Unlike chronic oak decline, acute oak decline can lead to the death of trees within 4 to 5 years of symptoms appearing. The number of trees affected is thought to number in the low thousands, with a higher number of infected trees being found in the Midlands. It is thought to be caused by a bacterium; it is currently not known which species is involved, but scientists are actively trying to discover what is responsible. At least three genera of bacteria are possibly responsible.

In some instances, the disease is accompanied by insects attacking the trees, too, particularly the oak splendour beetle, (Agrilus biguttatus). These are not thought to be the cause of the disease, but rather they are opportunistically taking advantage of already weakened trees; such infestations further weaken and can hasten the death of trees.

See also 
 Sudden oak death
 Ash dieback
 Dutch elm disease
 Kauri dieback

References

Further reading 
 

Bacterial tree pathogens and diseases
Environmental issues in the United Kingdom